Lin Yu-hui is a Taiwanese former footballer who played as a forward. She has been a member of the Chinese Taipei women's national team.

International career
Lin Yu-hui capped for Chinese Taipei at senior level during two AFC Women's Asian Cup qualifiers (2006 and 2008).

International goals
Scores and results list Chinese Taipei's goal tally first

References

Living people
Taiwanese women's footballers
Women's association football forwards
Chinese Taipei women's international footballers
Year of birth missing (living people)